Gebby Ristiyani Imawan (born 6 March 1992) is an Indonesian badminton player affiliated with Mutiara Cardinal Bandung club. She won a bronze medal at the 2013 Asian Championships, and at the same year, she participated at the World Championships and Southeast Asian Games.

Achievements

Asian Championships 
Women's doubles

BWF Grand Prix (1 runner-up) 
The BWF Grand Prix had two levels, the Grand Prix and Grand Prix Gold. It was a series of badminton tournaments sanctioned by the Badminton World Federation (BWF) and played between 2007 and 2017.

Women's doubles

  BWF Grand Prix Gold tournament
  BWF Grand Prix tournament

International Challenge/Series (4 titles, 2 runners-up) 
Women's doubles

  BWF International Challenge tournament
  BWF International Series tournament

Performance timeline

Indonesian team 
 Junior level

Individual competitions 
 Senior level

References

External links 

 

1992 births
Living people
People from Tangerang
Sportspeople from Banten
Indonesian female badminton players
Competitors at the 2013 Southeast Asian Games
Southeast Asian Games competitors for Indonesia
21st-century Indonesian women
20th-century Indonesian women